Pedro Soto Moreno (born 22 October 1952) is a Mexican former football league goalkeeper.

Career
He played for Mexico in the 1978 FIFA World Cup. He also played for Club América.

References

External links
FIFA profile

1952 births
Mexican footballers
Mexico international footballers
Association football goalkeepers
Club América footballers
1978 FIFA World Cup players
Liga MX players
Living people